Alexander M. York (1838 – February 25, 1928) was an American politician and Lieutenant Colonel in the Union army.

York commanded in the 15th United States Colored Infantry Regiment until it was mustered out of service in 1866.

York went on to serve in the Kansas State Senate from 1873–1874 in Independence, Kansas, in Montgomery County, Kansas. He died of nephritis in 1928.

His brother, Dr. William York, was one of the known victims of the notorious Bender family of Labette County, Kansas.

Notes

People from Independence, Kansas
Kansas state senators
1838 births
1928 deaths